Dorcadion pelidnum is a species of beetle in the family Cerambycidae. It was described by Vasily Evgrafovich Yakovlev in 1906.

See also 
 Dorcadion

References

pelidnum
Beetles described in 1906
Taxa named by Vasily Evgrafovich Yakovlev